DXCP (585 AM) Radyo Totoo is a radio station owned and operated by South Cotabato Communications Corporation, the media arm of the Roman Catholic Diocese of Marbel. The station's studio and transmitter are located along National Highway, Brgy. Lagao, General Santos.

References

Radio stations in General Santos
Radio stations established in 1971
Catholic radio stations
Christian radio stations in the Philippines